Olival may refer to the following places in Portugal:

 Olival (Ourém), a civil parish in the municipality of Ourem
 Olival (Vila Nova de Gaia), a civil parish in the municipality of Vila Nova de Gaia 
 Olival Basto, a civil parish in the municipality of Odivelas